Cavendishia grandifolia is a species of woody perennial plant of the genus Cavendishia in the family Ericaceae. It is native to Ecuador. Its fruit, commonly known as neotropical blueberries, are edible.

References

Vaccinioideae